Manakamana Secondary School is a school located in Jorpati, Kathmandu, the capital of Nepal. The school have classes from Play Group to +2. This school is fully fledged Co-educational institution. This school is registered under Ministry Of Education and has secured S.L.C Board's position. This school provides extra curricular activities. The school's motto is "Education for creativity and humanity". This school provides education to more than 1000 students. Manakamana is one of the highly ranked school in Gokarneshwar Municipality.

History
It was established in 1981 AD (2038 BS). This school was founded by Mr. Jagannath Devkota. He is the founder director of school. His son Mr. Janan Devkota is the administrator of the school.  The head master of this school is Mr. Ram Chandra Devkota. This school employs 50+ teachers. Environmentalist Mr. Nipesh DHAKA also taught as a Maths teacher in 2004-2005

References

External links
 

Schools in Kathmandu
1981 establishments in Nepal